Simon Nagra is a British Asian radio, television and theatre actor. Television roles include Ash Parmar in the BBC soap opera Doctors from 2004–2007, as well as roles in Casualty, The Bill, EastEnders, Three Girls, Dalziel and Pascoe, and others.

In 2017 he appeared in Midsomer Murders “Red in Tooth & Claw” as Dhruv Varma. He also appeared in the TV Mini-Series Three Girls as Daddy and Man Like Mobeen as Uncle Habib.

Theatrical work
Nagra has also worked extensively in theatre, including The Revenger's Tragedy, Rafta, Rafta..., Haroun and the Sea of Stories (National Theatre); Antony and Cleopatra (RSC); Play to Win (musical) (Soho); The Deranged Marriage (Rifco, Theatre Royal Stratford); East is East (Oldham Coliseum); A Song for a Sanctuary (Lyric Hammersmith); Embryo of Death (Young Vic); and others.

References

External links

Living people
British male stage actors
British male actors of Asian descent
Year of birth missing (living people)
British male Shakespearean actors
British male soap opera actors
Place of birth missing (living people)
British male radio actors